"What About the Love" is a song written by Kye Fleming & Janis Ian and released as a 1988 single by Christian music singer Amy Grant. It was released as the fourth single from Grant's Lead Me On album. Unlike some of Grant's previous singles, this song was released to Christian radio only and was not marketed to pop or "mainstream" radio.

"What About the Love" is a downtempo inspirational song that adopts a mysterious sound through the use of keyboards, acoustic guitars, and haunting background vocals. The lyrics center around the idea that "something's wrong in Heaven tonight", with each verse decrying some segment of society's neglect of another segment. The first verse tackles preachers who are too focused on religious legalism rather than love. The second verse talks of the corporate world's abuse of despair around the world. The third verse concerns the futility that the elderly feels when the world has decided that their "usefulness" is gone. Finally, the fourth verse finds the singer staring at herself in the mirror, realizing that she is no better than those she has criticized, and likening herself to those who crucified Jesus. The lyrics reveal that the eponymous "love" in the song refers to "the love of God".

Background

The first two singles from Lead Me On cracked the mainstream pop charts in addition to topping the U.S. Christian charts. The album's four remaining singles, however, charted only on Christian radio. The release of "What About the Love" came at a time when Grant was at what seemed to be the height of her career, having recently become the first Contemporary Christian music artist to achieve success on pop radio (though she would later achieve far greater success in the 1990s). The Lead Me On album is widely considered one of the greatest and most successful Christian albums ever recorded and was named the greatest of all time by CCM Magazine.

Personnel 
 Amy Grant – lead vocals
 Robbie Buchanan – keyboards 
 Carl Marsh – keyboards
 Alan Pasqua – keyboards
 Gary Chapman – acoustic guitar
 Dann Huff – guitars 
 Jerry McPherson – guitars
 Mike Brignardello – bass
 Paul Leim – drums
 Lenny Castro – percussion
 Mary Ann Kennedy – backing vocals 
 Pam Rose – backing vocals

Chart Success
"What About the Love" was a big success on Christian radio, becoming a No. 1 hit on the Christian music charts in the United States. However, it did not place on any of the major mainstream pop or Adult Contemporary charts.

Charts

Amy Grant songs
1988 singles
Songs written by Janis Ian
Songs written by Kye Fleming
Year of song missing
1988 songs